Mental may refer to:

 of or relating to the mind

Films
 Mental (2012 film), an Australian comedy-drama
 Mental (2016 film), a Bangladeshi romantic-action movie
 Mental, a 2008 documentary by Kazuhiro Soda
 Mental, a 2014 Odia language remake of the 2010 Telugu film Seeta Ramula Kalyanam
 Jai Ho, a 2014 Indian action drama film originally titled Mental

Other uses
 Mental (TV series), a 2009 TV series produced by Fox Telecolombia
 Mental (album), a 2014 album by KJ-52
"Mental", a song by Eels from their 1996 album Beautiful Freak

See also
 
 Mental disability (disambiguation) 
 Mental foramen, an opening on the anterior surface of the mandible
 Mental health